Manu Leiataua (born 26 December 1986) is a rugby union hooker who plays for Perpignan and Samoa.
Leiataua made his debut for Samoa in 2013 and was part of the squad at the 2015 Rugby World Cup.

References

External links

Living people
Samoa international rugby union players
1986 births
Rugby union players from Wellington City
People educated at Rongotai College
Rugby union hookers